The Ramapo Indian Hills Regional High School District is a comprehensive regional public school district consisting of two four-year public high schools serving students in ninth through twelfth grades from Franklin Lakes, Oakland, and Wyckoff, three suburban communities in Bergen County, New Jersey, United States. Students entering the district as freshmen have the option to attend either of the district's high schools, regardless of their residence, subject to a choice made during eighth grade.

As of the 2020–21 school year, the district, comprised of two schools, had an enrollment of 2,244 students and 217.6 classroom teachers (on an FTE basis), for a student–teacher ratio of 10.3:1.

The district is classified by the New Jersey Department of Education as being in District Factor Group "I", the second-highest of eight groupings. District Factor Groups organize districts statewide to allow comparison by common socioeconomic characteristics of the local districts. From lowest socioeconomic status to highest, the categories are A, B, CD, DE, FG, GH, I and J.

History 
With baby boomers filling the school beyond capacity, the Ramsey Public School District informed its sending districts of Franklin Lakes and Wyckoff in 1954 that it would no longer accept students from those two communities at Ramsey High School beyond the 1956-57 school year. Oakland, which sent its students to Pompton Lakes High School, joined the other two districts in pursuing a joint regional high school.

With Ramsey High School having already issued an ultimatum to its two Franklin Lakes, Oakland and Wyckoff (often called the FLOW district for the initial letters in the names of the three communities) approved the creation of a regional high school in 1954 by a vote of 1,060 to 51. The name "Ramapo Regional High School District" was chosen for the district in February 1954 when the inaugural board of education was sworn in.

By a nearly 3-1 margin, voters approved a February 1955 referendum that would cover the bulk of the $2.2 million (equivalent to $ million in ) required for the  site and the construction of the school building. A steel strike, bad weather and other construction obstacles delayed the opening of the new school building, forcing Ramapo High School to start the 1956-57 school year with evening sessions held at Eastern Christian High School in North Haledon, with the school day running from 2:45 to 7:00 PM. Constructed with a capacity for 1,080 students, the new almost-finished Ramapo High School building in Franklin Lakes opened in January 1957 with an enrollment of 655.

In the years after Ramapo High School opened, district enrollment rose from 650 to more than 2,000, ultimately requiring the school to operate with double sessions. Constructed at a cost of $3 million (equivalent to $ million in ), Indian Hills High School in Oakland opened in September 1964 serving 575 students in grades 9-11 from Oakland and portions of Franklin Lakes.

In 1999, the district allowed students from Franklin Lakes to choose which high school to attend, ending the policy under which students in the eastern half of Franklin Lakes were required to attend Ramapo High School while those in the borough's western half were assigned to Indian Hills High School. Oakland students were generally assigned to Indian Hills while Wyckoff residents could select which school to attend.

Schools 
Schools in the district (with 2020–21 enrollment data from the National Center for Education Statistics) are:
Indian Hills High School, located in Oakland (919 students)
Gregory Vacca, Principal
Ramapo High School, located in Franklin Lakes (1,285 students)
Travis Smith, Principal

Administration 
Core members of the district's administration are:
Dr. Rui Dionisio, Superintendent
Thomas Lambe, Business Administrator

Board of education
The district's board of education, comprised of nine members, sets policy and oversees the fiscal and educational operation of the district through its administration. As a Type II school district, the board's trustees are elected directly by voters to serve three-year terms of office on a staggered basis, with three seats up for election each year held (since 2012) as part of the November general election. The board appoints a superintendent to oversee the district's day-to-day operations and a business administrator to supervise the business functions of the district. Seats on the board are allocated based on the population of the constituent municipalities, with four seats allocated to Wyckoff, three to Oakland and two to Franklin Lakes.

References

External links
Ramapo Indian Hills Regional High School District website

School Data for the Ramapo Indian Hills Regional High School District, National Center for Education Statistics

Franklin Lakes, New Jersey
Oakland, New Jersey
Wyckoff, New Jersey
1954 establishments in New Jersey
New Jersey District Factor Group I
School districts established in 1954
School districts in Bergen County, New Jersey